Ian Bruce is a former Scottish international lawn bowler.

He won a gold medal for Scotland when he was part of the fours team at the 1990 Commonwealth Games in Auckland, New Zealand. The team consisted of George Adrain, Denis Love and Willie Wood.

References

Living people
Scottish male bowls players
Commonwealth Games medallists in lawn bowls
Commonwealth Games gold medallists for Scotland
Bowls players at the 1990 Commonwealth Games
Year of birth missing (living people)
Medallists at the 1990 Commonwealth Games